Odense Q is a Danish women's football team from Odense, playing in Kvinde 1. division, the second highest division of women's football in Denmark.

The team was originally created as the women's football section of Odense Boldklub. They were promoted into the top division for the first time in 1989. After losing the 1995 Danish Women's Cup final to Fortuna Hjørring, the team gained revenge in 1998 by beating Fortuna in the final and securing their first Cup win. Odense also won the Cup in 1999 and 2003, and the league title in 2000 and 2001.

Due to a lack of support from Odense Boldklub, the team decided to break away and form an independent women's football club for the 2016–17 Elitedivisionen season. A new logo was created, inspired by Hans Christian Andersen's The Ugly Duckling.

Players

Current squad

Former players
For details of former players, see :Category:Odense Q players.

Honours
As OB Odense:
 Elitedivisionen (2)
 2000, 2001
 Danish Women's Cup (3)
 1998, 1999, 2003

References

Women's football clubs in Denmark
Association football clubs established in 2016
Sport in Odense
2016 establishments in Denmark